The Creative BC Film Commission, formerly the BC Film Commission and also referred to as the Provincial Film Commission at Creative BC, is an agency established by the provincial government that promotes film and television in British Columbia including Metro Vancouver. Creative BC integrates the growth and development efforts of the province's creative industries including Motion Picture, Music and Sound Recording, Interactive and Digital Media, and Book and Magazine Publishing.

Formerly, the BC Film Commission fell under the Ministry of Community, Sport and Cultural Development. They operated under a budget of $948,000 for 2010-11.  The BC Film Commission and BC Film  and Media were merged in April 2013 to become Creative BC.  The services of both legacy organizations are offered by Creative BC. www.creativebc.com The film commission oversees eight regional commissions including Cariboo Chilcotin Coast Tourism, Columbia Shuswap Film Commission, the Greater Victoria Film Commission, Kootenay Film Commission, Northern B.C. Tourism, Okanagan Film Commission, Thompson-Nicola Film Commission and the Vancouver Island North Film Commission.  The film commission was involved in promoting the nickname Hollywood North for Vancouver.

See also
List of filming locations in Metro Vancouver
List of filming locations in the BC Interior
Cinema of Canada
Canadian pioneers in early Hollywood
Nicknames of Vancouver

References

External links
 Creative BC Film Commission - Provincial Film Commission at Creative BC

British Columbia government departments and agencies
Cinema of British Columbia
Film commissions
Film organizations in Canada